The Chiesa di Montevergine (Church of Montevergine), also known as San Girolamo is a Baroque-style Roman Catholic church in Noto, region of Sicily, Italy. 

The church was built between 1695 and 1697, after the 1693 Sicily earthquake that leveled the town. It was built for the Benedictine nuns of the Order of Monte Vergine. The church is dedicated to St Jerome.  The concave facade, flanked by two bell-towers, was completed in 1748 by Vincenzo Sinatra. The church rises at the top of stone steps, and the layout has a single nave flanked by Corinthian columns, and a rich stucco decoration. The interior has altarpieces by Constantino Carasi, including a Marriage of the Virgin and a Pieta.

References

Sicilian Baroque
17th-century Roman Catholic church buildings in Italy
18th-century Roman Catholic church buildings in Italy